Doubles is a common street food originating in Trinidad and Tobago of Indian origin. It is normally eaten during breakfast, but is also eaten occasionally during lunch or as a late night snack and popular hangover food for local Trinidadians. Doubles is made with two baras (flat fried dough) and filled with curry channa (curried chickpeas) and various chutneys.

Origins 
Doubles as a dish was created in Princes Town, by Emamool Deen (a.k.a. Mamoodeen) and his wife Raheman Rasulan Deen in 1936. 

It has been speculated that it was inspired by a northern Indian dish called chole bhature (or sometimes channa bhatura). Chole bhature is made by combining channa masala and bhature (poori), which is a fried bread made with maida flour, a common flour in Indian baking.

Mamoodeen used to sell curried channa (chickpeas) over single baras (fried flatbread) with chutneys. When his customers began requesting to double the bara in their orders the name “doubles” was coined.

Preparation 
Doubles can be served spicy, sweet, or savory.  Condiments include spicy pepper sauce, kuchela, or green mango, bandhaniya (also known as chadon beni or culantro), cucumber, coconut, and tamarind chutneys.

Cultural significance 
Given the diversity of Trinidad, doubles is credited with its ability to "define and maintain symbolic boundaries of identification", and is considered an authentic standard of Trinidadian cuisine. Doubles is a comfort food for displaced Trinidadians in major cities across the globe. Its consumption has been credited with developing a "deep psychological imprinting" among them, and as such is considered culturally significant for how it encapsulated Trinidadian identity into such a simple and unique snack.

See also

Cuisine of Trinidad and Tobago

References

External links
Doubles Recipe

Bread dishes
Chickpea dishes
Curry dishes
Deep fried foods
Indo-Caribbean cuisine
Street food
Trinidad and Tobago cuisine
Vegetarian sandwiches
Surinamese cuisine
Guyanese cuisine